Tillandsia polita is a species of flowering plant in the family Bromeliaceae, native to Mexico and Central America (El Salvador, Guatemala and Honduras). It was first described by Lyman Bradford Smith in 1941. , the Encyclopaedia of Bromeliads regarded it as a natural hybrid of Tillandsia rodrigueziana and Tillandsia rotundata.

References

polita
Flora of Mexico
Flora of Central America
Plants described in 1941